Royal Hillsborough (Irish: Cromghlinn, meaning 'Crooked Glen'), more commonly known simply as Hillsborough, is a village and civil parish in County Down, Northern Ireland,  from the city of Belfast. It is within the Lisburn and Castlereagh District Council area. The village is noted for its Georgian architecture. It is home to Hillsborough Castle, the British royal family's official residence in Northern Ireland, and residence of the British Secretary of State for Northern Ireland.

History
Before 1661, the townland was known as Crumlin or Cromlin. By 1661, during the Plantation of Ulster, the townland and the settlement within it had been renamed Hillsborough. It was named after English army officer Sir Moses Hill, and his son Sir Arthur Hill, who built Hillsborough Fort in 1650 to command the road from Dublin to Carrickfergus. The Hill family became the Earls of Hillsborough, then Marquesses of Downshire.

The mansion known as Hillsborough Castle was built in 1770 for The 1st Earl of Hillsborough (he was later created The 1st Marquess of Downshire, in 1789).

A prominent memorial to The 3rd Marquess of Downshire (1788–1845)—closely resembling Nelson's Column in Trafalgar Square, London—stands to the south of the village and is visible throughout much of the surrounding area.

In 2007, Hillsborough won 3rd place in the Ulster in Bloom large village competition.

In 2021, it was announced that letters patent would be issued granting the village the prefix "Royal", thus officially becoming "Royal Hillsborough", in recognition of Hillsborough Castle, the official royal residence for Northern Ireland. The letters patent came into effect on 20 October that year.

Governance
Hillsborough was within Lisburn City Council until 1 April 2015, when it formed part of the new Lisburn and Castlereagh District Council. Royal Hillsborough is located within the Westminster constituency of Lagan Valley and Northern Ireland Assembly constituency of Lagan Valley.

Demography
On Census day (27 March 2011) there were 3,952 people living in Hillsborough and Culcavy. Of these:
17.1% were aged under 16 years and 20.6% were aged 65 and over
48.4% of the population were male and 51.6% were female
81.6% were from a Protestant or other Christian background, and 9.8% were from a Catholic background
3.1% of people aged 16–74 were unemployed

Places of interest

Hillsborough Castle is a two-storey Georgian mansion, and served as Government House from 1924 until 1973. It remains the official residence of King Charles III (and other Royal Family members) when visiting Northern Ireland. It has also been the official residence of the Secretary of State for Northern Ireland since 1973. Hillsborough Castle was the venue for the signing of the Anglo-Irish Agreement in 1985. Former Prime Minister Tony Blair stayed at the castle on many occasions during negotiations related to the peace process, and he hosted President George W. Bush at the castle for a one night visit in 2003.
Hillsborough Fort
Hillsborough Forest Park and Lake forms the picturesque setting for the original fort residence of Lord Hillsborough. 
Hillsborough hosts an International Oyster Festival each year, usually in September. This attracts thousands of visitors. The festivities include boat racing, parachuting, garden fêtes, oyster eating and Guinness drinking.

The historic Parish Church dedicated to Saint Malachy is one of the finest examples of Gothic Revival architecture. It was built for The 1st Earl of Hillsborough between 1760 and 1774, in the hope that the church would become the cathedral of the Church of Ireland Diocese of Down and Connor. In addition to its imposing setting, it boasts two 18th century organs, a peal of ten bells and a number of works by notable craftsmen of the era, including the Colours of the County Down Battalion of Carson's Ulster Volunteers. Today it is a parish in the Church of Ireland Diocese of Down and Dromore.

Notable people
The composer and conductor Sir Hamilton Harty (1879–1941), whose father William Harty was organist in St. Malachy's Parish Church, was born in Hillsborough.
Hillsborough was home to TV and radio presenter Gloria Hunniford for a number of years. Her late daughter Caron Keating spent much of her childhood in the village.
Frank Pantridge (1916–2004) was a physician and cardiologist born in Hillsborough, who invented the portable defibrillator.

Railways

Hillsborough railway station was opened by the Banbridge, Lisburn and Belfast Railway on 13 July 1863.  
The line through the station was part of the Great Northern Railway (Ireland).
The station closed on 30 April 1956 under the auspices of the Great Northern Railway Board. Train services were replaced by bus services provided by the Ulster Transport Authority (UTA). No trace of the station now remains, as it was removed when the dual carriageway was built. It was situated where this crosses over the Culcavey Road.

Sport
In 2005 Lisnagarvey Hockey Club relocated from their Blaris ground to the outskirts of Hillsborough.
Downshire Young Men F.C.

Climate

See also
Hillsborough, County Down (civil parish)
List of towns and villages in Northern Ireland
List of localities in Northern Ireland by population
List of civil parishes of County Down

References

External links
Hillsborough – A Visitor's Guide (Lisburn City Council)

Villages in County Down
Townlands of County Down
Civil parish of Hillsborough, County Down